Wheatena is an American high-fiber, toasted-wheat cereal that originated on Mulberry Street in New York City, New York, when a small bakery owner began roasting whole wheat, grinding it, and packaging it for sale under this brand name.

History

Wheatena was created by George H. Hoyt in the late 19th century, when retailers would typically buy cereal (the most popular being cracked wheat, oatmeal, and cerealine) in barrel lots, and scoop it out to sell by the pound to customers. Hoyt, who had found a distinctive process of preparing wheat for cereal, sold his cereal in boxes, offering consumers a sanitary appeal.

Hoyt advertised the cereal in newspapers as early as 1879 and sold the business six years later to Dr. Frank Fuller, a physician with an interest in nutrition, who had founded the Health Food Company. Fuller adapted Hoyt's method to his own process for preparing a wheat cereal, and moved manufacturing to Akron, Ohio, close to the wheat supply.

A.R. Wendell bought Health Foods in 1903, and incorporated it as The Wheatena Company that year. In 1907, the company moved to a new plant, dubbed "Wheatenaville", in Rahway, New Jersey. By the mid-1920s, millions of boxes were sold each year.

In the early 1960s, the Kansas City, Missouri-based Uhlmann Company, owner of the Standard Milling Company, purchased both the Wheatena corporation and Highspire Flour Mills, which for several years had been supplying the 100% cracked wheat used in the cereal. Uhlmann moved Wheatena manufacturing to Highspire, Pennsylvania, in October 1967. The company began leasing its flour-milling facilities to the agribusiness giant ConAgra Foods in early 1987, and sold the cereal manufacturing operation to American Home Food Products in April 1988. Uhlmann retained rights to the Wheatena brand until shortly after International Home Foods acquired American Home Foods in November 1996 and then bought the brand name from Uhlmann. International Home Foods was in turn acquired by ConAgra in August 2000.

Entrepreneur William Stadtlander bought the brand and the Pennsylvania manufacturing plant on October 31, 2001, under the newly formed Homestat Farm, Ltd. of Dublin, Ohio, which as of 2006 manufactures Wheatena and fellow vintage cereals Maypo and Maltex.

In mid-2006, the state of California sued Homestat under California Proposition 65 (1986), which requires labeling for food containing acrylamide, a potential carcinogen created when starch is baked, roasted, fried or toasted, while Federal Food and Drug Administration (FDA) regulations do not.

In the media

In the early 1930s, Wheatena sponsored Wheatenaville on NBC's Pacific network. The program debuted September 26, 1932. The cast included Tom Hutchinson, Roberta Hoyt, "who is making her first radio appearance", Elizabeth Mallory and Eddie Firestone, Jr., "also radio novices", Harold Peary, "who is doing several parts", Wilda Wilson Church, Bobbe Deane, and Bert Horton, with Nelson Case as announcer.

Wheatena sponsored 87 episodes of the thrice-weekly Popeye the Sailor radio program on NBC's Red Network, from its Tuesday, Sept.10, 1935, premiere through March 28, 1936. The product was integrated into the narrative as a source, in addition to spinach, of Popeye's superhuman strength. Announcer Kelvin Keech would sing, to composer Sammy Lerner's "Popeye" theme, "Wheatena is his diet / He asks you to try it / With Popeye the sailor man". Wheatena reportedly paid King Features Syndicate $1,200 per week.

After this initial run, the show was broadcast Mondays, Wednesdays and Fridays at 7:15–7:30 p.m. on WABC (now WCBS-AM) from August 31, 1936 to February 26, 1937, for an additional 78 episodes. Once again, sung references to spinach were conspicuously absent. Now Popeye would sing, "Wheatena's me diet / I ax ya to try it / I'm Popeye the Sailor Man".

Nutritional analysis

"Nutrition Facts" required by California's Proposition 65:
 Acrylamide – 1057 (ppb)

"Nutrition facts" as they appear on a 2007 box:

Ingredients:  toasted crushed whole wheat, wheat bran, wheat germ and calcium carbonate.
Serving size: 1/3 cup (dry)
Amount per serving:
Calories 160
Calories from fat 10
Total fat 1
Saturated fat 0 grams
Trans Fat 0g
Polyunsaturated Fat 0.5g
Monounsaturated fat 0g
Cholesterol 0 milligrams
Sodium 0 mg
Potassium 190 mg
Total carbohydrate 32g
Dietary fiber 5.5g
Sugars 0g
Protein 5g
Vitamin A 0%
Vitamin C 0%
Calcium 20%
Iron 10%
Riboflavin 4%
Niacin 10%
Phosphorus 20%

"Nutrition facts" as they appear on 2006 box

Serving size: 1 cup (141 grams)
Amount per serving
 Calories – 503
 Calories from fat – 37
 Total fat – 4.1g
 Saturated fat – 0.6g
 Polyunsaturated fat – 2.1g
 Monounsaturated fat – 0.6g
 Cholesterol – 0 mg
 Sodium – 18 milligrams
 Total carbohydrates – 106.6g
 Dietary fiber – 18.0g
 Sugars – 2.3g
 Protein – 18.5g
% Daily Value, based on a 2000-calorie diet
 Vitamin A – 1%
 Vitamin C – 0%
 Calcium – 4%
 Iron – 28%

Audio

1930s Popeye the Sailor Wheatena audio clip

Video

National Association of Manufacturers: "Cool Stuff Being Made: How Cereal Is Made – Wheatena": video by the Pennsylvania Cable Network

See also

 Farina (food)
 List of porridges

References

External links

Breakfast cereals
Porridges
Wheat